Lophonycta is a genus of moths of the family Noctuidae erected by Shigero Sugi in 1970.

Species
Lophonycta confusa (Leech, 1889) Japan
Lophonycta neoconfusa Chang, 1991 Taiwan

References

Acronictinae